The FM- and TV mast Hosingen is a 300-metre-high guyed radio mast outside the town of Hosingen, Luxembourg used for FM and TV broadcasting. It has a diameter of 2 metres and was built in 1970. The FM- and TV-mast Hosingen is the tallest construction in Luxembourg and property of RTL.

The FM- and TV-mast Hosingen carries antennas at a height of 285 metres, pointed toward Germany. These antennas are used for transmitting the German-speaking program of RTL on 97,0 MHz with an ERP of 100 kW. The antennas for the transmission of the native radio station on 92,5 MHz with an ERP of 50 kW are mounted at a height of 237 metres. As transmission device for both frequencies, Telefunken S 3217 transmitters with an output power of 10 kW is used. For each frequency there is also a backup transmitter installed, with an output power of 10 kW, a Telefunken S 3152.

See also 
 List of masts

References

External links 

 
 http://www.skyscraperpage.com/diagrams/?b45491
 https://theantennasite.com/countries/luxembourg/hosingen-umknupp.html

Hosingen
Hosingen
Hosingen
Transmitter sites in Luxembourg